This local electoral calendar for 2013 lists the subnational elections held in 2013. Referendums, recall and retention elections, and national by-elections (special elections) are also included.

January
6 January: Thailand, Chonburi constituency 2, House of Representatives by-election
17 January: Bangladesh, Chittagong-12, House of the Nation by-election
20 January: 
Bolivia, Beni, 
Germany, Lower Saxony, Parliament
21 January: Trinidad and Tobago, Tobago, House of Assembly
22 January: 
Indonesia, South Sulawesi, Governor
Saint Kitts and Nevis, Nevis, Island Assembly
26 January: Singapore, Punggol East, Parliament by-election
27 January: 
Germany, Leipzig, Lord Mayor (1st round)
Japan
Gifu, 
Yamagata, Governor
29 January: 
Cook Islands, Tamarua, Parliament by-election
Indonesia, Papua, Governor
30 January: India, Assam, District Councils, Township Councils and Village Councils (1st phase)

February
3 February: 
Cuba, Provincial Assemblies
Ivory Coast, Bangolo, Bonon, Divo, Facobly, Issia and Koumassi, National Assembly by-elections
6 February: India, Assam, District Councils, Township Councils and Village Councils (2nd phase)
9 February: Thailand, Lopburi constituency 4, 
11 February: Uganda, Butaleja, Parliament by-election
12 February: India, Assam, District Councils, Township Councils and Village Councils (3rd phase)
14 February: India, Tripura, Legislative Assembly
17 February: Germany, Leipzig, Lord Mayor (2nd round)
23 February: 
India
Meghalaya, Legislative Assembly
Nagaland, Legislative Assembly
Nigeria, Gombe, Local Government Councils and Chairmen
24 February: Indonesia, West Java, 
24–25 February: Italy
Lazio, Regional Council
Lombardy, Regional Council
Molise, Regional Council
26 February: United States, Wichita, City Council (1st round)
27 February: Solomon Islands, Nggela, Parliament by-election
28 February: 
United Kingdom, Eastleigh, House of Commons by-election
Zambia, Mpongwe, National Assembly by-election

March
3 March: 
Austria
Carinthia, Parliament
Lower Austria, Parliament
Switzerland
Aargau, 
Appenzell Ausserrhoden, 
Basel-Landschaft, 
Basel-Stadt, 
Bern, 
Geneva, referendums
Grisons, 
Jura, referendum
Neuchâtel, referendum
Nidwalden, 
Obwalden, 
Schaffhausen, 
Schwyz, 
Solothurn, Executive Council (1st round) and Cantonal Council
Ticino, referendums
Valais, 
Zürich, 
Thailand, Bangkok, Governor
4 March: Kenya, Governors and County Assemblies
5 March: 
Federated States of Micronesia, Chuuk, Governor (1st round), House of Representatives and Senate
United States
Los Angeles, Mayor and City Council (1st round)
Oklahoma City, City Council (1st round)
7 March: 
India, Karnataka, City Corporations, Municipal Councils and Town Councils
Indonesia, North Sumatra, 
United Kingdom, Mid Ulster, House of Commons by-election
9 March: 
Australia, Western Australian, Legislative Assembly and Legislative Council
Malta, Local Councils
14 March: Zambia, Livingstone, National Assembly by-election
16 March: Nigeria, Federal Capital Territory, Local Government Councils and Chairmen
17 March: 
France, Oise's 2nd constituency and Wallis and Futuna's 1st constituency, National Assembly by-elections (1st round)
Japan, Chiba, 
Peru, Lima, 
Switzerland, Valais, 
22 March: 
Antigua and Barbuda, Barbuda, Council
Turks and Caicos, Cheshire Hall and Richmond Hill, House of Assembly by-election
23 March: Nigeria, Bayelsa, Local Government Councils and Chairmen
24 March: 
France, Oise's 2nd constituency and Wallis and Futuna's 1st constituency, National Assembly by-elections (2nd round)
Republic of Macedonia, Mayors and Municipal Councils (1st round)
27 March: Ireland, Meath East, Assembly by-election

April
2 April: 
Federated States of Micronesia, Chuuk, Governor (2nd round)
Greenland, Municipal Councils and Settlement Councils
United States
Anchorage, Assembly
Colorado Springs, City Council
Las Vegas, City Council (1st round)
Oklahoma City, City Council (2nd round)
Omaha, Mayor and City Council (1st round)
St. Louis, Mayor and Board of Aldermen
Wichita, City Council (2nd round)
Wisconsin, Superintendent of Public Instruction, Supreme Court and Court of Appeals
4 April: The Gambia, 
6 April: Botswana, Letlhakeng West, National Assembly by-election
7 April: 
France, Alsace, Single Territorial Collectivity referendum
India, Jharkhand, Municipal Corporations
Japan, Akita, Governor
Republic of Macedonia, Mayors and Municipal Councils (2nd round)
Northern Cyprus, North Nicosia Mayor and Municipal Council
9 April: United States, Illinois's 2nd congressional district, U.S. House of Representatives special election
14 April: 
Ethiopia, City Councils, District Councils and Neighborhood Councils (1st phase)
Switzerland
Neuchâtel, Council of State (1st round) and Grand Council
Solothurn, Executive Council (2nd round) and 
17 April: India, Mizoram, Chakma Autonomous District, Council
20 April: 
Iraq, Provincial Councils
Jordan, Amman's 2nd district, House of Representatives by-election
Nigeria, Edo, Local Government Councils and Chairmen
21 April: 
Ethiopia, City Councils, District Councils and Neighborhood Councils (2nd phase)
Ivory Coast, 
Japan, Nagoya, 
Paraguay, 
Poland, senatorial constituency No. 73, 
Thailand
Chiang Mai constituency 3, 
Ranong, Senate by-election
21–22 April: Italy, Friuli-Venezia Giulia, Regional Council, Mayors and Municipal Councils (1st round)
23 April: Zambia, Kapiri Mposhi and Lukulu West, National Assembly by-election
24 April: 
Germany, Bavaria, 
South Korea, Busan Yeongdo, Seoul Nowon 5 and South Chungcheong Buyeo–Cheongyang, 
28 April: 
Austria, Tyrol, Parliament
India, Uttarakhand, Municipal Corporations, Municipal Councils and Town Councils
Japan, Yamaguchi at-large district, 
Switzerland, Appenzell Innerrhoden, Landsgemeinde

May
2 May: United Kingdom
South Shields, House of Commons by-election
England, County Councils, Unitary Authorities and Mayors
Buckinghamshire, County Council
Cambridgeshire, County Council
Cornwall, Council
Cumbria, County Council
Derbyshire, County Council
Devon, County Council
Dorset, County Council
Durham, County Council
East Sussex, County Council
Essex, County Council
Gloucestershire, County Council
Hampshire, County Council
Hertfordshire, County Council
Isle of Wight, Council
Isles of Scilly, Council
Kent, County Council
Lancashire, County Council
Leicestershire, County Council
Lincolnshire, County Council
Norfolk, County Council
North Yorkshire, County Council
Northamptonshire, County Council
Northumberland, County Council
Nottinghamshire, County Council
Oxfordshire, County Council
Shropshire, Council
Somerset, County Council
Staffordshire, County Council
Suffolk, County Council
Surrey, County Council
Warwickshire, County Council
West Sussex, County Council
Wiltshire, Council
Worcestershire, County Council
Wales, Isle of Anglesey, County Council
4 May: Nigeria, Kogi, Local Government Councils and Chairmen
5 May: 
Armenia, Yerevan, City Council
Austria, Salzburg, Parliament
India, Karnataka, Legislative Assembly
Malaysia, Legislative Assemblies
Switzerland, Glarus, 
5–6 May: Italy, Friuli-Venezia Giulia, Mayors and Municipal Councils (2nd round)
6 May: Australia, Tasmania, (Montgomery, Nelson and Pembroke) Legislative Council
7 May: United States, South Carolina's 1st congressional district, U.S. House of Representatives special election
11 May: 
Pakistan
Balochistan, Provincial Assembly
Khyber Pakhtunkhwa, Provincial Assembly
Punjab, Provincial Assembly
Sindh, Provincial Assembly
United States
Arlington, Mayor and City Council
Dallas, City Council (1st round)
El Paso, Mayor (1st round)
Fort Worth, Mayor and City Council (1st round)
San Antonio, Mayor and City Council (1st round)
13 May: 
Canada, Labrador, House of Commons by-election
Indonesia, West Nusa Tenggara, 
Philippines, Governors, Provincial Councils, Mayors and Municipal Councils
Autonomous Region in Muslim Mindanao, Governor and Regional Assembly
14 May: 
Canada, British Columbia, Legislative Assembly
United States, Omaha, Mayor and City Council (2nd round)
15 May: Indonesia, Bali, 
16 May: 
India, Arunachal Pradesh, Municipal Councils, District Councils, Township Councils and Village Councils
Tonga, 
19 May: 
Croatia, County Prefects, County Councils, Mayors and Municipal Councils 
India, Punjab, District Councils and Township Councils
Pakistan, Karachi, National Assembly revote
Switzerland, Neuchâtel, Council of State (2nd round)
20 May: India, Assam, North Cachar Hills, Autonomous District Council
21 May: United States, Los Angeles, Mayor and City Council (2nd round)
23 May: Isle of Man, Douglas West, House of Keys by-election
25 May: 
Bangladesh, Naogaon-5, House of the Nation by-election
France, First constituency for French residents overseas, National Assembly by-elections (1st round)
26 May: 
Equatorial Guinea, Municipal Councils
France, Eighth constituency for French residents overseas, National Assembly by-elections (1st round)
Germany, Schleswig-Holstein, 
Indonesia, Central Java, Governor
Italy, Aosta Valley, Regional Council
26–27 May：Italy, Mayors and Municipal Councils (1st round)
Rome, Mayor and City Council (1st round)
27 May: Vanuatu, Tanna, Parliament by-election
28 May: Indonesia, Malang,

June
1 June: Latvia, Municipal Councils
Riga, City Council
2 June: 
Croatia, County Prefects, County Councils, Mayors and Municipal Councils 
India
Banaskantha, Porbandar, Maharajganj and Howrah, House of the People by-elections
Haryana, Municipal Corporations and Municipal Councils
4 June: United States
Missouri's 8th congressional district, U.S. House of Representatives special election
Las Vegas, City Council (2nd round)
6 June: 
Indonesia, South Sumatra, 
Uganda, Butebo, Parliament by-election
8 June: France, First constituency for French residents overseas, National Assembly by-elections (2nd round)
9 June: 
France, Eighth constituency for French residents overseas, National Assembly by-elections (2nd round)
Switzerland
Aargau, 
Basel-Landschaft, 
Lucerne, 
Nidwalden, 
Obwalden, 
Schaffhausen, 
Solothurn, 
St. Gallen, 
Ticino, referendum
Uri, 
Vaud, referendums
Zug, 
Zürich, 
9–10 June: Italy
Mayors and Municipal Councils (2nd round)
Rome, Mayor and City Council (2nd round)
Sicily, Mayors and Municipal Councils (1st round)
11 June: 
Indonesia, Maluku, 
United States, Tulsa, Mayor (1st round)
14 June: Iran, City Councils and Village Councils
Tehran, City Council
15 June: 
Bangladesh
Barisal, Mayor and City Corporation
Khulna, Mayor and City Corporation
Rajshahi, Mayor and City Corporation
Sylhet, Mayor and City Corporation
United States
Dallas, City Council (2nd round)
El Paso, Mayor (2nd round)
Fort Worth, City Council (2nd round)
San Antonio, City Council (2nd round)
16 June: 
France, Lot-et-Garonne's 3rd constituency, National Assembly by-elections (1st round)
Japan, Shizuoka, 
Tanzania, Chambani, National Assembly by-election
Thailand, Bangkok constituency 12, House of Representatives by-election
20 June: 
Iraq
Al Anbar, Provincial Council
Nineveh, Provincial Council
United Kingdom, Scotland, Aberdeen Donside, Scottish Parliament by-election
Zambia, Feira, National Assembly by-election
22 June: United States, Cherokee Nation, Tribal Council (1st round)
23 June: 
France, Lot-et-Garonne's 3rd constituency, National Assembly by-elections (2nd round)
India, Mandi, House of the People by-election
Indonesia, Bandung, Mayor
Japan, Tokyo, Metropolitan Assembly
Northern Cyprus, Municipal Councils, Village Heads and Village Councils
23–24 June: Italy, Sicily, Mayors and Municipal Councils (2nd round)
25 June: United States, Massachusetts, U.S. Senate special election
28 June: Tuvalu, Nukufetau, Parliament by-election
29 June: 
New Zealand, Ikaroa-Rāwhiti, Parliament by-election
Nigeria, Imo, Oguta, House of Assembly revote
30 June: Argentina, Misiones, House of Representatives and Private Prosecutors in Criminal Cases constitutional referendum

July
1 July: Indonesia, North Maluku, 
3 July: 
Bangladesh, Kishoreganj-4, House of the Nation by-election
India, Punjab, Village Heads and Village Councils
4 July: Gibraltar, Parliament by-election
6 July: Bangladesh, Gazipur, Mayor and City Corporation
6 July – 9 August: Papua New Guinea, Local-Level Governments
7 July: 
Mexico, State elections
Aguascalientes, 
Baja California, 
Chihuahua, 
Coahuila, 
Durango, 
Hidalgo, 
Oaxaca, 
Puebla, 
Quintana Roo, 
Sinaloa, 
Tamaulipas, 
Tlaxcala, 
Veracruz, 
Zacatecas, 
Ukraine, Sevastopol constituency 224, Parliament by-election
11 July: India, West Bengal, District Councils, Township Councils and Village Councils (1st phase)
15 July: India, West Bengal, District Councils, Township Councils and Village Councils (2nd phase)
17 July: Saint Helena, Ascension and Tristan da Cunha, Saint Helena, Legislative Council
19 July: India, West Bengal, District Councils, Township Councils and Village Councils (3rd phase)
21 July: Japan, Hyōgo, 
22 July: India, West Bengal, District Councils, Township Councils and Village Councils (4th phase)
23 July: India, Andhra Pradesh, Village Councils (1st phase)
25 July: 
India, West Bengal, District Councils, Township Councils and Village Councils (5th phase)
Zambia, Chipata Central, Kafulafuta, Mkushi North and Solwezi East, National Assembly by-elections
27 July: 
India, Andhra Pradesh, Village Councils (2nd phase)
Kenya, Makueni, Senate by-election
United States, Cherokee Nation, Tribal Council (2nd round)
29 July: Trinidad and Tobago, Chaguanas West, House of Representatives by-election
31 July: 
India, Andhra Pradesh, Village Councils (3rd phase)
Zimbabwe, Urban Councils, District Councils and Ward Councils

August
1 August: United Kingdom, Wales, Ynys Môn, Welsh Parliament by-election
5 August: Indonesia, East Nusa Tenggara, Governor
6 August: United States, King County, Executive and Council (1st round)
21 August: India, Mandya and Bangalore Rural, House of the People by-elections
22 August: 
India, Ladakh, Kargil District, Ladakh Autonomous Hill Development Council
Pakistan, NA-1, NA-5, NA-13, NA-27, NA-48, NA-68, NA-71, NA-83, NA-103, NA-129, NA-177, NA-235, NA-237, NA-254 and NA-262, National Assembly by-elections
25 August: Japan, Yokohama, Mayor
27 August: 
Jordan, Mayors and Municipal Councils
United States, Phoenix, City Council (1st round)
29 August: Indonesia, East Java, 
31 August: Indonesia, Tangerang,

September
4 September: Indonesia, Riau, 
5 September: Zambia, Mkaika, National Assembly by-election
8 September:
Japan, Ibaraki, 
Poland, senatorial constituency No. 55, 
Russia, 
Arkhangelsk Oblast, 
Bashkortostan, 
Buryatia, 
Chechnya, 
Chukotka Autonomous Okrug, 
Irkutsk Oblast, 
Ivanovo Oblast, 
Kalmykia, 
Kemerovo Oblast, 
Khabarovsk Krai, 
Khakassia,  and 
Leningrad Oblast, 
Magadan Oblast, 
Moscow (City), Mayor special election
Moscow Oblast, Governor special election
Rostov Oblast, 
Sakha, 
Smolensk Oblast, 
Ulyanovsk Oblast, 
Vladimir Oblast,  and 
Yaroslavl Oblast, 
Yekaterinburg, 
Zabaykalsky Krai,  and 
8–9 September: Norway, Sámi Parliament
10 September: 
Indonesia, East Kalimantan, 
Tuvalu, Nui, Parliament by-election
United States, Colorado, Senate recall election
14 September: Indonesia, Bogor, 
15 September: 
Argentina, Corrientes, 
Germany, Bavaria, Parliament,  and 
18 September: 
Indonesia, Makassar, Mayor
Pakistan, NA-25, National Assembly by-election
19 September: 
Cook Islands, Murienua, Parliament by-election
India, Odisha, Municipal Corporation, Municipal Councils and Notified Area Councils
21 September: 
Iraq, Kurdistan Region, National Assembly
Sri Lanka, Central, North Western and Northern, Provincial Councils
22 September: 
Germany
Hamburg, Energy Network referendum
Hanover, Lord Mayor (1st round)
Hesse, Parliament
Switzerland
Aargau, 
Basel-Landschaft, 
Basel-Stadt, 
Geneva, referendum
Grisons, 
Lucerne, 
Nidwalden, 
Obwalden, 
Schaffhausen, 
Solothurn, 
Ticino, referendums
Uri, 
Zug, 
Zürich, 
24 September: 
Canada, Newfoundland and Labrador, Mayors and City Councils
United States, Boston, City Council (1st round)
28 September: Kuwait, Municipal Council
29 September: Portugal, Municipal Chambers, Municipal Assemblies and Parish Assemblies
30 September: 
Cameroon, 
India, Assam, Dibrugarh District, Sonowal Kachari Autonomous Council

October
2 October: Indonesia, Lampung, Governor
3 October: 
Bangladesh, Barguna-2, House of the Nation by-election
India, Assam, Dhemaji District, Mising Autonomous Council (1st phase)
5 October: Nigeria
Delta Central, Senate by-election
Ebonyi, Local Government Councils and Chairmen
6 October: 
Germany, Hanover, Lord Mayor (2nd round)
Switzerland, Geneva,  and Grand Council
7 October: India, Assam, Dhemaji District, Mising Autonomous Council (2nd phase)
8 October: 
Canada, Nova Scotia, House of Assembly
United States
Albuquerque, Mayor and City Council (1st round)
Raleigh, Mayor and City Council (1st round)
12 October: New Zealand, Regional Councils, Mayors, Territorial Authority Councils and District Health Boards
Auckland, Mayor, Council and Local Boards
Wellington, Mayor and Council
16 October: United States, New Jersey, U.S. Senate special election
17 October: Kenya, Kibwezi West and Matungulu, National Assembly by-elections
19 October: Australia
Christmas Island, Shire Council
Cocos (Keeling) Islands, Shire Council
Western Australia, Mayors, Regional Councils, City Councils and Shire Councils
20 October: Estonia, Municipal Councils
21 October: 
Canada, Alberta, Mayors and Municipal Councils
Calgary, Mayor, City Council and School Trustees
Edmonton, Mayor, City Council and School Trustees
Trinidad and Tobago, Trinidad, Regional Councils and Municipal Councils
22 October: Israel, 
24 October: United Kingdom, Scotland, Dunfermline, Scottish Parliament by-election
26 October: Nigeria, Kwara, Local Government Councils and Chairmen
27 October: 
Argentina
Buenos Aires, Chamber of Deputies and Senate
Buenos Aires City, City Legislature
Catamarca, Chamber of Deputies and Senate
Chaco,  Chamber of Deputies
Formosa, Chamber of Deputies
Jujuy, Provincial Legislature
La Rioja, Provincial Legislature
Mendoza, Chamber of Deputies and Senate
San Luis, Chamber of Deputies, Senate, Mayors and Municipal Councils
Santiago del Estero, 
Italy
South Tyrol, Provincial Council
Trentino, President and Provincial Council
Japan, Miyagi, Governor
Kazakhstan, Regional Councils and City Councils
27–28 October: Sudan, Abyei, Status referendum
28 October: 
Canada, Nunavut, Legislative Assembly
Philippines
Ward Chairs and Ward Councils
Davao del Sur, Davao Occidental Creation referendum
30 October: 
Indonesia, Padang, 
South Korea, Gyeonggi Gyeonggi and North Gyeongsang Pohang–Ulleung, 
31 October: 
Indonesia, North Maluku, 
Saint Helena, Ascension and Tristan da Cunha, Ascension Island, Council
Uganda, Buhweju, Parliament by-election

November
2 November: Nigeria, Enugu, Local Government Councils and Chairmen
3 November: 
Canada, Quebec, Mayors and Municipal Councils
Montreal, Mayor and City Council
Quebec City, Mayor and City Council
Germany, Berlin, Energy referendum
Kosovo Mayors (1st round) and Municipal Councils
North Kosovo Mayors (1st round) and Municipal Councils
4 November: Trinidad and Tobago, St. Joseph, House of Representatives by-election
5 November: 
Israel, 
United States, State and Local elections
New Jersey, Governor, General Assembly, Senate and Minimum Wage referendum
New York, Allow Casinos referendum
Pennsylvania, Supreme Court and Superior Court retention elections, and Superior Court
Virginia, Governor, Lieutenant Governor, Attorney General and House of Delegates
Washington, Court of Appeals and Genetically Modified Food Labels referendum
Atlanta, Mayor and City Council (1st round)
Aurora, CO, City Council
Boston, Mayor and City Council (2nd round)
Charlotte, Mayor and City Council
Cincinnati, Mayor and City Council
Cleveland, Mayor and City Council
Columbus, City Council
Detroit, Mayor and City Council
Houston, Mayor and City Council (1st round)
King County, Executive and Council (2nd round)
Seattle, Mayor and City Council
Miami, Mayor and City Commission (1st round)
Minneapolis, Mayor, City Council, Board of Estimate and Taxation and Park and Recreation Board
New York City, Mayor, Comptroller, Public Advocate, Borough Presidents and City Council
Phoenix, City Council (2nd round)
Pittsburgh, Mayor and City Council
Raleigh, City Council (2nd round)
San Francisco, Assessor-Recorder, City Attorney, Treasurer, Board of Supervisors and Referendums
Tucson, City Council
9 November: 
Jordan, Amman's 1st district, House of Representatives by-election
Slovakia, Governors and Regional Councils
10 November: 
Argentina, Salta, Chamber of Deputies and Senate
Japan, Hiroshima, 
Switzerland, Geneva, 
11 November: India, Chhattisgarh, Legislative Assembly (1st phase)
12 November: United States, Tulsa, Mayor (2nd round)
13 November: India, Assam, Goalpara District and Kamrup District, Rabha Hasong Autonomous Council (1st phase)
16 November: 
India, Assam, Goalpara District and Kamrup District, Rabha Hasong Autonomous Council (2nd phase)
Nigeria, Anambra, Governor
United States, Louisiana's 5th congressional district, U.S. House of Representatives special election
17 November: 
Chile, Regional Councils
Kosovo, North Kosovo Mayors (1st round revote)
17–18 November, Italy, Basilicata, Regional Council
19 November: 
Denmark, Regional Councils and Municipal Councils
India, Chhattisgarh, Legislative Assembly (2nd phase)
United States
Albuquerque, City Council (2nd round) and Abortion referendum
Miami, City Commission (2nd round)
San Diego, Mayor special election (1st round)
20 November: Mozambique, 
22 November: Zambia, Mansa Central, National Assembly by-election
23 November: Mauritania, Municipal Councils (1st round)
24 November: 
Honduras, 
Peru, Lima, 
Switzerland
Aargau, 
Basel-Stadt, 
Bern, Bernese Jura, 
Jura, Grand Jura referendum
Lucerne, 
Neuchâtel, referendums
Schaffhausen, 
25 November: 
Canada, Bourassa, Brandon—Souris, Provencher and Toronto Centre, House of Commons by-elections
India
Goalpara District and Kamrup District, Rabha Hasong Autonomous Council (3rd phase)
Madhya Pradesh, Legislative Assembly
Mizoram, Legislative Assembly
27 November: Indonesia, Riau, 
30 November: New Zealand, Christchurch East, Parliament by-election

December
1 December: 
Argentina, Santiago del Estero, 
India, Rajasthan, Legislative Assembly
Kosovo Mayors (2nd round)
North Kosovo Mayors (2nd round)
3 December: United States, Atlanta, City Council (2nd round)
4 December: India, Delhi, Legislative Assembly
7 December: 
Mauritania, Municipal Councils (2nd round)
Pakistan, Balochistan, Metropolitan Corporations, Municipal Corporations, Municipal Committees, District Councils and Unions Councils (1st phase)
8 December: Venezuela, Mayors and Municipal Councils
10 December: United States, Massachusetts's 5th congressional district, U.S. House of Representatives special election
14 December: 
Gabon, Departmental Councils and Municipal Councils
Indonesia, Maluku, 
United States, Houston, City Council (2nd round)
15 December: 
Kosovo, North Kosovo Mayors (2nd round revote)
Ukraine, Kiev constituency 94, Mykolaiv constituency 132, Cherkasy constituency 194, Cherkasy constituency 197 and Kiev constituency 223, 
17 December: United States, Alabama's 1st congressional district, U.S. House of Representatives special election
19 December: Kenya
Bomachoge Borabu, National Assembly by-election
Bungoma, Senate by-election
24 December: Israel, 
28 December: Nigeria, Yobe, Local Government Councils and Chairmen
30 December: Kenya, Nyaribari Chache, National Assembly by-election

References

2013 elections
2013
Political timelines of the 2010s by year
local